Vriesea fibrosa is a plant species in the genus Vriesea. This species is native to the State of Amazonas in southern Venezuela.

References

fibrosa
Endemic flora of Venezuela
Epiphytes
Plants described in 1957